Brody the bear (born January 14, 1995 in Sequim, Washington) is a male Kodiak bear who is trained to be an animal actor. His adult size and weight also compare him to the late Bart the Bear.         

The bear was raised and trained by his owner, Jeff and the late Leanne Watson, since he was 8 weeks old and weighed less than 10 pounds (4.5 kg). His first television appearance was on Good Morning America at the age of 12 weeks. He has appeared in numerous films, television shows, commercials and print ads and has worked with some of the top wildlife photographers in the United States. He also appeared on the cover of National Geographic Magazine in July 2001.

Brody and Watson have traveled throughout the United States educating the public about bears and safety while spending time in bear country hiking, camping and fishing. During their travels, they had the opportunity to spend a day with Muhammad Ali at his private residence.

Brody the Bear is sponsored by Berne Apparel, a manufacturer of outdoor work apparel, as their live mascot and is pictured in the company's corporate logo and other marketing materials.

Filmography

See also
 List of individual bears

External links

Individual animals in the United States
Bear actors